Lophochaeta is a genus of annelids belonging to the family Naididae.

The species of this genus are found in Eurasia and Northern America.

Species:
 Lophochaeta ignota Štolc, 1886 
 Lophochaeta paucipilifer Holmquist, 1985

References

Naididae